Asplanchna brightwellii are a species of rotifer from the genus Asplanchna.

References

https://www.marinespecies.org/aphia.php?p=taxdetails&id=416486#images